The women's 100 metres T64 event at the 2020 Summer Paralympics in Tokyo, took place between 30 and 31 August 2021.

Records
Prior to the competition, the existing records were as follows:

Results

Heats
Heat 1 took place on 2 September, at 20:55:

Heat 2 took place on 2 September, at 21:01:

Final
The final took place on 3 September 2021, at 19:14:

References

Women's 100 metres T64
2021 in women's athletics